Drammenshallen is an indoor arena located in Drammen, Norway. It opened in 1978 and is primarily used for handball, and to a lesser extent, track and field, trade shows, exhibitions, and in the past major concerts. Drammen HK and Glassverket IF is currently the main tenant at the facility. The capacity is approximately 4,000 or 6,000 for concerts.

History
The hall was known for large concerts in the 1980s. Some of the notable artists to have performed at the venue include Duran Duran, Kiss, Elton John, Jethro Tull, Eric Clapton, Iron Maiden, Paul Simon, Thin Lizzy, Bon Jovi, Bruce Springsteen, Stevie Wonder, Bob Marley, Tina Turner, Bob Dylan and Queen.

The future of the hall remains uncertain as there are plans to replace it. The hall will host the 2025 World Men's Handball Championship with the country, Croatia and Denmark.

See also
 List of indoor arenas in Norway
 List of indoor arenas in Nordic countries

References

External links

Buildings and structures in Drammen
Music venues in Norway
Indoor arenas in Norway
Indoor track and field venues in Norway
Concert halls in Norway